is a Japanese figure skater. He is the 2021 CS Cup of Austria silver medalist, the 2020 NHK Trophy bronze medalist, and the 2020–21 Japan junior national champion.

Personal life 
Honda was born on September 15, 2002, in Osaka, Japan. As of 2018, he is a high school student in Uji, Kyoto.
In 2021, he entered Doshisha University.

Career 
His first encounter with skating was in kindergarten. In the second grade of elementary school, entered a class taught by coach Tsuyako Yamashita and began skating in earnest. He studied under coach Kotoe Nagasawa since childhood.

He moved to the senior class for 2022-23 season.

Programs

Competitive highlights 
GP: Grand Prix; CS: Challenger Series; JGP: Junior Grand Prix

2019–20 season to present

Pre-international debut

Detailed results

Senior level

References

External links 
 

Japanese male single skaters
2002 births
Living people
Sportspeople from Osaka